Patrick Rigobert Amrhein (born 20 October 1989 in Aschaffenburg) is a German footballer who plays for TuS Frammersbach.

References

1989 births
Living people
People from Aschaffenburg
Sportspeople from Lower Franconia
Footballers from Bavaria
German footballers
FC Carl Zeiss Jena players
Eintracht Braunschweig players
Eintracht Braunschweig II players
SpVgg Unterhaching players
Viktoria Aschaffenburg players
2. Bundesliga players
3. Liga players
Association football midfielders